Sibolga (formerly sometimes Siboga) is a city and a port located in the natural harbor of Sibolga Bay on the west coast of North Sumatra province, in Indonesia.

It is located on the western side of North Sumatra, facing the Indian Ocean and is a transit harbor to the Nias island which was hard hit during the 2004 Indian Ocean earthquake. Sibolga is also a semi-enclave within Central Tapanuli Regency, as Sibolga borders with Central Tapanuli Regency in the north, east, and south, while it borders with the Mentawai Strait in the west.

The city has an area of 10.77 km2 and had a population of 84,444 at the 2010 census and 89,584 at the 2020 census. Sibolga is the smallest city in Indonesia.

Administrative districts
The city is divided into four districts (kecamatan), tabulated below with their areas and their populations at the 2010 census and the 2020 census. The table also includes the number of administrative villages (desa and kelurahan) in each district and its post codes.

History 
Poncan Ketek Island (Small Poncan Island) in Sibolga Bay was once the location of a fort. British, Dutch, French and American traders passed through here. It is thought Stamford Raffles passed through before he moved to Bengkulu in south Sumatra. From Bengkulu Raffles, after relinquishing the Port to the Dutch, established the trade port that became Singapore.

At some point between 1890 and 1920 there was a major fire in the city, which was presumably mostly built from wood from the surrounding mountains (shown partly denuded in the 1928 panorama).

A presumably makeshift prison described as a "civilian camp" was set up on Taroetoengweg, in the city center, from 16 March to 4 May 1942. It first housed 10 "European" men from in and around Sibolga, who were then joined on April 24 by another 10 men from the island of Nias. On May 4 they were taken to the Native Secondary School for Boys in Pearadja (Taroetoeng), which is located up in the mountains behind Sibolga.

Transport and tourism 
Buses are available from Medan, Parapat and Padang. Ferries from here service the outlying islands to the west, Simeulue and Nias, as well as the rest of Indonesia. Sibolga is a step off point for trade and passenger boats to Nias Island. The local airport is Ferdinand Lumban Tobing Airport.

Climate
This area has a tropical rainforest climate with no real dry season.  Regions with this climate typically feature tropical rainforests, and are designated by the Köppen climate classification as "Af".

Gallery

References

External links

 
Ports and harbours of Indonesia
Ports and harbours of the Indian Ocean